Ernst Friedrich Wilhelm Hugo Höffert (25 October 1832 – 8 April 1901) was a German photographer, who ran studios in numerous German cities.

Life 
Höffert's parents were actors. He was born during a theatre engagement of his parents in Stralsund. The mother was the actress Emilie Wilhelmine Johanna Louise Höffert (1808–1857), née Devrient, the daughter of the actor Ludwig Devrient. The father was the actor and director Wilhelm David Höffert. As a child, Höffert was probably accompanied by his mother, his brother Louis and sister Elise. In 1840, she was engaged at the Grand Ducal Court Theatre in Schwerin. From 1845 to 1851, she was a court actress at the Oldenburg Court Theatre.

From Oldenburg, the 16-year-old Höffert went to the Kunstakademie Düsseldorf in 1848 to be taught painting by Karl Ferdinand Sohn and Theodor Hildebrandt, who introduced him in particular to portrait painting. Hildebrandt assessed his achievements with the grade "very good". In 1850, Höffert left the art academy.

Whether Höffert had in fact subsequently spent time as a photographer in Warsaw and Russia, as his mother had assumed, is not known.

In 1860, he entered into a business partnership with the photographer and painter Moritz Unna in Gothenburg. Unna had opened a studio in Gothenburg in 1853 as a daguerreotypist, and from 1855, the address was Drottninggatan 68. The joint company traded as Unna & Höfferts Fotografiska Atelier with the address Södra Hamngatan 41. In 1863, the partnership was dissolved and Unna went to Copenhagen, where he bought the photographic studio of Rudolph Striegler.

Höffert presumably returned to Germany in the same year and opened a photographic studio in Dresden under his name. Höffert was one of the first photographers to become entrepreneurial, setting up photographic studios under the name "W. Höffert" in several cities and/or had them operated. The names of the operators/studio owners were in many cases not known, The business relationships do not seem to have been clear. Only the photographer Georg Brokesch called himself managing director of the Leipzig studio from 1872 to 1875.

From 1872 to 1884, Höffert lived in Dresden at Pragerstaße 32 and until 1889 at Lüttichaustr. 18. According to the entry in the Dresden address books, he had given procuration to his wife Mila Höffert in 1876. She is first listed as a co-owner in the Berlin and Dresden address books of 1895. It is not known which area of responsibility she had in particular.

In 1892, Höffert entered the US via New York. He was married a second time and lived in Chicago. It is not known when he left the USA again.

Even though a large number of photographs still exist today on which the name "W. Höffert" was printed, neither much is known about Höffert's life and whereabouts, nor how long he photographed or portrayed himself.

Höffert was married to Bohumila (called Mila) Wehle. She was the daughter of the Sorbs writer Jan Wjela-Radyserb/ Johann Wehle (1822–1907). From this marriage came the son Ludwig, with whom she continued the business after Höffert's death in April 1901.<ref>Copy of a lapel "W. Höffert Inhaber Ludwig Höffert & Mila Höffert Hofphotographograph ... H. d. Prinzen Friedr. Leopold v. Preussen, Sr. Hoh. d. Prinzen Maximilian v. Baden, Hofphotographin Sr. Majestät d. König von Sachsen & Sr. Kgl. Hoh. d. Grossherzogs v. Mecklenburg..., Hannover Georgstrasse, Dresden Leipzig Hamburg Magdeburg (Online, University of Kassel), further source: Adreßbuch der Hoflieferanten im Königreich Sachsen, 1904, Höffert, P. Ludw., Hofphotograph Königreich Preußen, zugleich Sr. Majestät des Deutschen Kaisers, Schöneberg, (also of Prince Leopold of Prussia) page 12; Höffert, M. verw. Court Photographer of the Grand Duchy of Mecklenburg-Schwerin, Dresden, page 14; Höffert, P. Ludw., Court Photographer to the King of Great Britainn, page 18; (Numerized, SLUB).</ref> In 1903, presumably in the summer, Mila Höffert filed for bankruptcy. In July 1904, she was tried for fraud before the Dresden District Court. The son had evaded the proceedings by fleeing abroad.

Höffert died in Wiesbaden at the age of 68.

 W. Höffert — Ateliers und Filialen 
Herzfeld had acquired the studio. (source: Vermischtes. In Der Photograph, 13. Jg., No. 48, Hanover, 1903)
 in Leipzig from ca. 1869 until April 1876 in " 24" and from 15 April 1876 until 1905 in der Schlossgasse 16 im Kaufhaus August Polich
 in Chemnitz from about 1872 to 1878 at Zwickauerstraße 1 im Garten and from 1879 to 1893 with the address Langestraße 18.
 in Bad Ems (start and period unknown),
 in Karlsruhe in 1875 and 1876 in der Hirschstraße 36.StadtWiki Karlsruhe, (Online).
 in Nice in the "Rue du temple No. 5". (1876–1881)
 In Berlin, there is evidence of the studio at Leipziger Platz 12 from 1885 to 1897, and from 1892 to 1900 in Unter den Linden 24.There is contradictory information on the dates of Prof. Dr. Sibylle Einholz (Berliner Fotografenateliers), for the last time the entry W. Höffert Photograph. Kunstanstalt with address "Unter den Linden 24" is listed in the name register in the Berlin address book of 1904 and in the business register in the address book of 1903..
 in Breslau at "Tauentzienplatz 11'" (start and period unknown),
 in Hamburg from 1881 until 1899 in the  5b/Jungfernstieg 6 (ab 1885 Jungfernstieg 12)/Stadtwassermühle 5 and from 1900 to 1902 in the Esplanade 47, Alsterthor 14/16
 in Hanover in the " 9", first entry in the address book's list of residents in 1879 with the note "Prok.: Ehefr. Höffert, Mila, née Wehle", from 1885 "Archit. ", from 1889 at number 14, from 1901 number 8, from 1892 "Inh. Photogr. Jul. Benade", from 1894 Wilhelm Höffert and wife Mila, from 1897 instead of the wife the son "Ing. und Photogr. Paul Ludw. Höffert", from 1902 "We.[Witwe] Mila Höffert, geb. Wehle" and son, from 1904 "Lemförderstraße 1", from 1905 "Wihelm Höffert Nachf.", Alfred von Carlowitz-Hartitzsch,
 in Magdeburg in the "Breiteweg 196/197", (start and period unknown)
 in Bonn, from 30 July 1900 to 1901 in the "Coblenzerstr. ",
 in Düsseldorf, "Alleestraße 40", First entry in the address book (trade) of 1897. The entry "Höffert, Wilhelm Ehefr., geb. Wehle", from 1899 "Höffert, Wilhelm, Hofphotograph", later owner Julius Staegemann.
 in Cologne from 1896 bis ca. 1906 in der Hohestraße 55 (later Hohestraße 111a).
 in Potsdam, "Humboldtstr. 1", subsequent owner C. Wohlatz
On the backs of some of the photographs, Munich is still indicated as the location of the studio.

After the insolvency of W. Höffert, in some locations the operators continued the studios using the name W.[ilhelm] Höffert Nachf.[olger], for example in Leipzig the photographers E. & M. Foerstner (or Förstner) initially at Schloßgasse 1/corner of Petersbrücke, from 1906 to 1907 at the address Barfußgasse 15, in Düsseldorf and in Hamburg Johann Kagel from 1903 to 1906. in "Alstertor 14/16". The address book of the city of Bonn in 1903 verzeichnet den Fotografen Ferd[inand] Bauer in der Coblenzerstr. 8a als Inhaber von "W. Höffert".

 Known assistants and apprentices 
The photographer Nicola Perscheid had been employed as a photographer's assistant in Höffert's Dresden studio in Seestrasse for two years before opening his own studio in 1891.

In 1894/95, the later successful photographer Hugo Erfurth completed a one-year apprenticeship at Höffert's.Bodo von Dewitz, Karin Schuller-Procopovici (ed.): Hugo Erfurth, 1874–1948. Photograph zwischen Tradition und Moderne. Wienand, Cologne 1992, 

 Court photographer 
 As Crown Prince, the later King Albert of Saxony Wilhelm Höffert (around 1872, exact date not known) the title of Kingdom of Saxony Court pohotographer.
 A few years later (date unknown), Höffert indicated by depicting the coat of arms that he had also been appointed by the Kingdom of Prussia Court Photographer.
 Later (date unknown) he also depicted the coat of arms of the Prince of Wales page and later King Edward VII, which identified him as a purveyor to the court for photographs.
 The fourth coat of arms shown identifies W. Höffert as a purveyor to the court of the House of Mecklenburg-Schwerin.
 Prince Friedrich Leopold of Prussia.In the Berlin address books of 1895.
 Prince Maximilian of Baden.

 Photographs 

 Further reading 
 Address books div. cities
 Horst Milde: Dresdner Atelier-Fotografie. Verlag der Kunst, Dresden, 1991, .
 Christina Ossowski (Bearb.): Historische Kameras und Leipziger Photographie 1840–1950, Katalog zur gleichnamigen Ausstellung im Museum der bildenden Künste Leipzig vom 12. März bis zum 1. Mai 1983, hrsg. im Auftrag des Rates des Bezirkes Leipzig, Museum der bildenden Künste, Leipzig 1983
 
 Jürgen Matschie (ed.): Wótmólowane – Mit Licht gemalt. Historische Fotografien in der sorbischen/wendischen Niederlausitz. Domowina-Verlag, Bautzen 2017, Review: 
 Maria Mirtschin: Visuelle Identifikationen. Aspekte der Bildnisfotografie bei den Sorben vom 19. Jahrhundert bis zum Ersten Weltkrieg. Kleine Reihe des Sorbischen Instituts 22, Bautzen 2014, ; Table of contents (PDF)
 
 
 Anna Löhn-Siegel: Ein Bild aus dem Schauspielerleben. In Die Gartenlaube. 1885,  (Volltext [Wikisource).Gartenlaube
 Die einzige Tochter Ludwig Devrient's. In Anna Löhn-Siegel: Vom Oldenburger Hoftheater zum Dresdner. letzte Theatertagebuchblätter, Schulzesche Hof-Buchh. und Hof-Buchdr., Oldenburg 1885, pp. 53 ff., (simialar text in the Die Gartenlaube)

 References 

 External links 
 

  
 
 
 
  Im Gegensatz zu den hier gemachten Angaben hieß das niederländische Schiff „Dubbeldam“. Ausgangshafen war wahrscheinlich Amsterdam. Nach Angaben der Ellis Island Foundation'' reiste Höffert mit einer 30-jährigen „Mrs. Wilhelm Hoffert“ ein.
  Höffert hielt sich von Januar bis Juni 1872 in Bad Homburg auf
 

19th-century German painters
19th-century German male artists
German portrait painters
19th-century German photographers
Portrait photographers
Saxon Royal Warrant holders
1832 births
1901 deaths
People from Stralsund